CYP may refer to:

 CYP, IATA airport code for Calbayog Airport in the Philippines
 CYP, national railway code for Crystal Palace railway station in London, UK
 CYP, ISO 3166-1 alpha-3 country code for Cyprus
 CYP, ISO 4217 code for the Cypriot pound
 Cyclophilin
 Cytochrome P450, isoenzyme
 Cypripedium, orchid genus